"Paint It Black" is a 1966 song by The Rolling Stones.

Paint It Black or Paint It, Black may also refer to:

 Paint It Black (band), an American hardcore punk band
 Paint It Black (novel), a novel by Janet Fitch
 "Paint It Black" (BiSH song), 2018
 "Paint It Black", an episode from the Canadian television series The Bridge
 Paint It Black (1989 film), a film directed by Tim Hunter
 Paint It Black (2016 film), a film directed by Amber Tamblyn based on Janet Fitch's novel
 "Amai Wana (Paint It, Black)", a song by Hikaru Utada on First Love
 "Paint It Black", a song by the Finnish rock band Smack

See also
 Painted Black (disambiguation)